The 2007 Thailand Open was a tennis tournament played on indoor hard courts. It was the 5th edition of the Thailand Open, and was part of the International Series of the 2007 ATP Tour. It took place at the Impact Arena in Bangkok, Thailand, from September 24 through September 30, 2007.

The singles field featured ATP No. 3, French Open and Wimbledon semifinalist, US Open runner-up, Adelaide, Estoril, Miami Masters and Canada Masters champion Novak Djokovic, Australian Open semifinalist, Queen's Club and Washington titlist Andy Roddick, and Halle winner Tomáš Berdych. Also lined up were Memphis champion Tommy Haas, Umag winner Carlos Moyá, Dmitry Tursunov, Ivo Karlović and Fernando Verdasco.

Finals

Singles

 Dmitry Tursunov defeated  Benjamin Becker, 6–2, 6–1
It was Dmitry Tursunov's 2nd title of the year, and his 3rd overall.

Doubles

 Sanchai Ratiwatana /  Sonchat Ratiwatana defeated  Michaël Llodra /  Nicolas Mahut, 3–6, 7–5, [10–7]

External links
Official website
Singles draw
Doubles draw
Qualifying Singles draw

 

Tennis in Bangkok
Tennis tournaments in Thailand